Martin Toshev (born 17 April 1990) is a Bulgarian professional footballer who plays as a forward for Etar Veliko Tarnovo.

Career

CSKA Sofia
He was raised in CSKA Sofia's youth teams. In January 2008 Toshev went to Germany and trained at 1. FC Köln's Youth Academy. However, after six months he returned to Bulgaria and signed his first professional three-year contract with CSKA. On 6 December 2008, Toshev scored his first goals for the "armymen" - he secured a brace in the 5:0 away rout against PFC Balkan Botevgrad in the 1/8 final of the Bulgarian Cup.

Chernomorets Burgas
Toshev transferred to Chernomorets Burgas, after the end of the 2008-09 season. On 12 July he signed a four-year deal for a €100,000.
On 17 August 2009, Toshev made his debut for the team from Burgas after coming on as a substitute for Michel Mesquita in the 2:1 home win against Lokomotiv Plovdiv. On 21 August 2009, he assisted Kostadin Dyakov's equalizing goal in the 1:1 away draw against Beroe. On 12 September 2009, he scored his first goal for Chernomorets, opening the scoring in the 5:0 away win against Lokomotiv Mezdra. His last match for Chernomorets Burgas was on 11 April 2011 against OFC Sliven 2000, when he was seriously injured. In January 2012 he was released from Chernomorets Burgas.

Slavia Sofia
In March 2012 Toshev signed a contract with Slavia Sofia, playing 9 games for the club during the 2011/12 season.

Septemvri Sofia
On 8 July 2017, after spending the first half of the 2016–17 season in Erzgebirge Aue and the second on loan in VfR Aalen, Toshev returned to Bulgaria signing with the newly promoted to the Bulgarian First League team of Septemvri Sofia.

He made his debut for the team on 17 July 2017 in match against Dunav Ruse. He left the club at the end of 2017–18 season when his contract expired.

Ahed
In June 2018, Toshev signed with Lebanese champions Al-Ahed.He became the first ever Bulgarian player to play for Al-Ahed and for the Lebanese premier league.

CSKA 1948 and Zhetysu
Toshev joined CSKA 1948 in June 2019, but spent only a few weeks with the team before being signed by Zhetysu in Kazakhstan for 5 years.

International career
Toshev has been capped for the Bulgaria U21 national team.

Career statistics

Honours and achievements

Club
CSKA Sofia
 Bulgarian Supercup: 2008

Al Ahed
 AFC Cup: 2019
 Lebanese Premier League: 2018–19
 Lebanese FA Cup: 2018–19
 Lebanese Super Cup: 2018

References

External links

1990 births
Living people
People from Blagoevgrad Province
Bulgarian footballers
Bulgaria under-21 international footballers
First Professional Football League (Bulgaria) players
Second Professional Football League (Bulgaria) players
2. Bundesliga players
3. Liga players
Lebanese Premier League players
Kazakhstan Premier League players
Liga I players
PFC CSKA Sofia players
1. FC Köln II players
PFC Chernomorets Burgas players
PFC Slavia Sofia players
FC Septemvri Simitli players
OFC Pirin Blagoevgrad players
FC Erzgebirge Aue players
VfR Aalen players
FC Septemvri Sofia players
Al Ahed FC players
FC CSKA 1948 Sofia players
FC Zhetysu players
LPS HD Clinceni players
FC Shakhter Karagandy players
Bulgarian expatriate footballers
Bulgarian expatriate sportspeople in Germany
Bulgarian expatriate sportspeople in Lebanon
Bulgarian expatriate sportspeople in Kazakhstan
Bulgarian expatriate sportspeople in Romania
Expatriate footballers in Germany
Expatriate footballers in Lebanon
Expatriate footballers in Kazakhstan
Expatriate footballers in Romania
Association football forwards
Sportspeople from Blagoevgrad Province